Thiago Xavier is a masculine Brazilian given name. Notable people with the name include:

Thiago Xavier Rodrigues Corrêa, (born 1983) Brazilian footballer
Thiago Xavier Rosa, (born 1984) Brazilian footballer

Brazilian given names
Masculine given names